David Jones (David Henry Jones; born 11 March 1940) was a British athlete who competed in the 100 & 200 metres. He won three consecutive AAA titles at 220 yards (1959–1961). He was educated at Felsted School.

He competed for Great Britain in the 1960 Summer Olympics held in Rome in the 4 x 100 metre relay where he won the bronze medal with his team mates Peter Radford, David Segal and Nick Whitehead. He reached the 100 metres semi final where he was denied a place in the final in a photo finish with Ray Norton of the USA although there are photos that seem to suggest he finished ahead of Norton. David Jones subsequently won a gold medal in the 4 x 110 yards relay in the England team with Peter Radford, Alf Meakin, Len Carter, as well as winning a silver medal in the 220 yards event in the 1962 British Empire and Commonwealth Games in Perth.

He was part of the 4 x 110 yards relay team (Peter Radford, Ron Jones & Berwyn Jones were his team mates) who defeated the USA team (which included Bob Hayes) at the White City Stadium in 1963 during the GB v USA match. He was holder of World Best performance over 150 yards in time of 13.9 secs in May 1961 at Southend-on-Sea, England. David was also part of the ITV Track & Field commentary team for the 1964 Tokyo Olympics.

External links

English male sprinters
Olympic bronze medallists for Great Britain
Athletes (track and field) at the 1960 Summer Olympics
Olympic athletes of Great Britain
People educated at Felsted School
1940 births
Living people
Athletes (track and field) at the 1962 British Empire and Commonwealth Games
Athletes (track and field) at the 1966 British Empire and Commonwealth Games
Commonwealth Games silver medallists for England
Commonwealth Games medallists in athletics
European Athletics Championships medalists
Medalists at the 1960 Summer Olympics
Olympic bronze medalists in athletics (track and field)
Medallists at the 1962 British Empire and Commonwealth Games